Robert Antropov (born January 29, 1965 in Rakvere) is an Estonian politician. He was a member of XI Riigikogu.

References

Living people
Estonian Reform Party politicians
Isamaa politicians
Members of the Riigikogu, 2007–2011
1965 births
People from Rakvere